The 1941 New York Yankees season was the 39th season for the team. New York was managed by Joe McCarthy. The Yankees played their home games at Yankee Stadium. The team finished with a record of 101–53, winning their 12th pennant, finishing 17 games ahead of the Boston Red Sox. In the World Series, they beat the Brooklyn Dodgers in 5 games.

Books and songs have been written about the 1941 season, the last before the United States became drawn into World War II. Yankees' center fielder Joe DiMaggio captured the nation's fancy with his lengthy hitting streak that extended through 56 games before finally being stopped. A big-band style song called Joltin' Joe DiMaggio was recorded by the Les Brown orchestra and became a hit the following year.

Additionally, DiMaggio, Tommy Henrich and Charlie Keller became the only outfield trio in major league history to each hit 30 home runs in a season.

Regular season
May 15, 1941: In a game against the Chicago White Sox, Joe DiMaggio began his major league record 56-game hitting streak with a hit off Sox pitcher Eddie Smith.

During the hitting streak, DiMaggio had a batting average of .408, hit 15 home runs, and accumulated 55 runs batted in. After the streak ended, DiMaggio began a 16-game hitting streak. DiMaggio would hit safely in 72 of 73 games, another record.

Season standings

Record vs. opponents

Roster

Player stats

Batting

Starters by position
Note: Pos = Position; G = Games played; AB = At bats; H = Hits; Avg. = Batting average; HR = Home runs; RBI = Runs batted in

Other batters
Note: G = Games played; AB = At bats; H = Hits; Avg. = Batting average; HR = Home runs; RBI = Runs batted in

Pitching

Starting pitchers
Note: G = Games pitched; IP = Innings pitched; W = Wins; L = Losses; ERA = Earned run average; SO = Strikeouts

Other pitchers
Note: G = Games pitched; IP = Innings pitched; W = Wins; L = Losses; ERA = Earned run average; SO = Strikeouts

Relief pitchers
Note: G = Games pitched; W = Wins; L = Losses; SV = Saves; ERA = Earned run average; SO = Strikeouts

1941 World Series 

AL New York Yankees (4) vs. NL Brooklyn Dodgers (1)

Awards and honors
Joe DiMaggio, AL MVP
Joe DiMaggio, Associated Press Athlete of the Year

Farm system

LEAGUE CHAMPIONS: Joplin, Easton, Butler

Notes

References
1941 New York Yankees at Baseball Reference
1941 World Series
1941 New York Yankees team page at www.baseball-almanac.com

New York Yankees seasons
New York Yankees
New York Yankees
1940s in the Bronx
American League champion seasons
World Series champion seasons